"The One Like You" (also translated as "That One Person Is You") is a ballad song performed by South Korea-based American singer Jessica Jung.
The song was released as a digital single on July 2, 2013, and was the fourth soundtrack single album to be unveiled for the TV drama series tvN's Dating Agency: Cyrano starring then fellow Girls' Generation member Choi Sooyoung.

Production
The song was composed and arranged by Melodesign (Kim Doo-hyun), widely known for working on various songs of the artists under Jellyfish Entertainment including Seo In-guk's "With Laughter or with Tears". The lyrics were penned by Kim Ji-hyang, known for working on the lyrics of U-Kiss's "Take Me Away".

Chart performance

References

External links
 "The One Like You" on iTunes
 "The One Like You" on Melon 
 "The One Like You" on Naver
 "The One Like You" music video on Daum

Korean-language songs
Girls' Generation songs
SM Entertainment singles
2013 songs